The roughskin spurdog (Cirrhigaleus asper) is a dogfish of the family Squalidae, found circumglobally between latitudes 35°N and 35°S, at depths of between  and .

The roughskin spurdog is ovoviviparous with 21 to 22 young in a litter.

References

 
 Compagno, Dando, & Fowler, Sharks of the World, Princeton University Press, New Jersey 2005 

Cirrhigaleus
Fish described in 1973
Taxa named by Nigel Merrett